Brian O'Sullivan (born 2001) is an Irish hurler. At the club level he plays with Kanturk, while he is also a member of the Cork senior hurling team.

Career

O'Sullivan first played hurling and Gaelic football at juvenile and underage levels with the Kanturk club, before progressing to adult level as a dual player. He was part of the Kanturk senior hurling team that won the Cork SAHC title after a defeat of Fr. O'Neill's in the 2021 final. He was also part of the Kanturk intermediate football team that won the Cork PIFC title after a defeat of Bantry Blues in 2022. O'Sullivan has also lined out with the University of Limerick and won a Fitzgibbon Cup title in 2022.

O'Sullivan first appeared on the inter-county scene as captain of the Cork minor hurling team in 2018. He later progressed to the under-20 team and won consecutive All-Ireland U20HC titles in 2020 and 2021. 

O'Sullivan made his senior team debut during the 2023 National League.

Career statistics

Honours

University of Limerick
Fitzgibbon Cup: 2022

Kanturk
Cork Senior A Hurling Championship: 2021
Cork Premier Intermediate Football Championship: 2022

Cork
Munster Senior Hurling League: 2023
All-Ireland Under-20 Hurling Championship: 2020, 2021
Munster Under-20 Hurling Championship: 2020, 2021

References

2001 births
Living people
Kanturk hurlers
Kanturk Gaelic footballers
Cork inter-county hurlers